The Schmaar is a river of Mecklenburg-Vorpommern, Germany. Its source lies between Wittenburg and Hagenow. It flows through Hagenow, and flows into the Sude near Redefin. Part of its course is called Kleine Sude.

See also
List of rivers of Mecklenburg-Vorpommern

Rivers of Mecklenburg-Western Pomerania
Rivers of Germany